The following is a list of the Sweden national football team's competitive records and statistics.

Honours

Major titles
 FIFA World Cup
 Runner-up (1): 1958
 Third place (2): 1950, 1994
 Fourth place (1): 1938
 UEFA European Championship
 Semi-final (1): 1992
 Olympic football tournament
 Gold Medal (1): 1948
 Bronze Medal (2): 1924, 1952

Minor titles
 Nordic Football Championship
 Winners (9): 1933–36, 1937–47, 1948–51, 1952–55, 1956–59, 1960–63, 1964–67, 1968–71, 1972–77

Individual records

Player records 

Players in bold are still active with Sweden.

Most capped players

Top goalscorers

Age-related records
Age-related records of the Swedish national football team.

 Oldest player 40 years, 5 months and 26 days – Zlatan Ibrahimović (0–2 against Poland on 29 March 2022)
 Youngest debutante 17 years, 2 months and 11 days  – Gunnar Pleijel (5–2 against Finland on 22 October 1911)
 Oldest debutante 34 years, 9 months and 1 day – Stendy Appeltoft (3–0 against Finland on 28 August 1955)
  Longest national career 21 years, 1 month and 29 days – Zlatan Ibrahimović (from 31 January 2001 until 29 March 2022)
 Oldest goalscorer 37 years, 11 months and 26 days – Gunnar Gren (two goals in a 4–4 draw against Denmark on 26 October 1958)
 Youngest goalscorer 17 years, 3 months and 22 days – Alexander Isak (one goal in a 6–0 win against Slovakia on 12 January 2017)

 Manager records 

 Team records 

Competition records
 Champions   Runners-up   Third place   Fourth place   Tournament held on home soil  

FIFA World Cup

UEFA European Championship

UEFA Nations League

Olympic Games

Football at the Summer Olympics was first played officially in 1908. The Olympiads between 1896 and 1980 were only open for amateur players. The 1984 and 1988 tournaments were open to players with no appearances in the FIFA World Cup. After the 1988 Olympics, the football event was changed into a tournament for U23 teams with a maximum of three older players. See Sweden Olympic football team for competition record from 1984 until present day.

Nordic Football Championship

Minor tournaments

Head-to-head records
The following table shows Sweden's all-time international record. The abandoned match against Denmark on 2 June 2007 here counts as a draw.Statistics updated as of 18 June 2021.''

Matches not counted as international matches by FIFA
This is a list of matches that the Swedish FA counts as official international matches, but not FIFA. All these matches are included in the table above.

 Sweden 1–6 England Amateurs (Gothenburg, Sweden; 8 September 1908)
 England Amateurs 7–0 Sweden (Kingston upon Hull, England; 6 November 1909)
 Sweden 1–5 England Amateurs (Solna, Sweden; 10 June 1914)
 Sweden 4–1 Norway (Tampere, Finland; 21 July 1952)
 Sweden 3–1 Austria (Helsinki, Finland; 23 July 1952)
 Hungary 6–0 Sweden (Helsinki, Finland; 28 July 1952)
 Sweden 2–0 Germany (Helsinki, Finland; 1 August 1952)
 Hungary 4–0 Sweden (Budapest, Hungary; 4 May 1963)
 Sweden 2–2 Hungary (Gothenburg, Sweden; 27 October 1963)
 Sweden 4–2 Norway (Lahti, Finland; 28 February 1981)
 Sweden 4–0 United States (Jönköping, Sweden; 23 February 1984)
 Romania 0–2 Sweden (Bangkok, Thailand; 9 February 1997)
 Sweden 1–0 Denmark (La Manga, Spain; 31 January 2000)
 South Africa 1–1 Sweden (Nelspruit, South Africa; 22 January 2011)
 Cyprus 0–2 Sweden (Nicosia, Cyprus; 8 February 2011)
 Qatar 0–5 Sweden (Doha, Qatar; 23 January 2012)
 Sweden 1–1 (4–1 p) North Korea (Chiang Mai, Thailand; 23 January 2013)
 Sweden 3–0 Finland (Chiang Mai, Thailand; 26 January 2013)
 Sweden 0–1 Finland (Abu Dhabi, United Arab Emirates; 19 January 2015)
 Sweden 1–1 Estonia (Abu Dhabi, United Arab Emirates; 6 January 2016)
 Finland 0–3 Sweden (Abu Dhabi, United Arab Emirates; 10 January 2016)
 Sweden 1–2 Ivory Coast (Abu Dhabi, United Arab Emirates; 8 January 2017)
 Sweden 6–0 Slovakia (Abu Dhabi, United Arab Emirates; 12 January 2017)
 Sweden 1–1 Estonia (Abu Dhabi, United Arab Emirates; 7 January 2018)
 Sweden 1–0 Denmark (Abu Dhabi, United Arab Emirates; 11 January 2018)-->

References 

Sweden national football team records and statistics
National association football team records and statistics